Martin Wimbush (born 1949) is a British actor known for his roles in film, television, and theatre.

Early life and education 
Born in London, Wimbush trained at the Guildhall School of Music and Drama between 1967 and 1969, and then worked extensively in regional theatre, before going into television and then later into film.

Career 
His television appearances include Upstairs, Downstairs (1975), The Glittering Prizes (1976), Happy Ever After (1976), Agony (1981), Educating Marmalade (1982), No Problem! (1983), Terry and June (1983), Boon (1986), Lovejoy (1993), Hale and Pace (1993), Then Churchill Said to Me (1993), The Old Curiosity Shop (1995), A Dance to the Music of Time (1997), Vanity Fair (1998), Randall and Hopkirk (2000), Micawber (2001), The Iron Duke (2002), The Lost Prince (2003), Born and Bred (2003), Cape Wrath (2007), Garrow's Law (2009), EastEnders (2010), and Hustle (2012).

Wimbush appeared in the films Orlando (1992), Gangster No. 1 (2000), Mean Machine (2001), Bridget Jones's Diary (2001), Ali G Indahouse (2002), Wimbledon (2004), The Iron Lady (2012), and Scar Tissue (2012).

His stage appearances include The Rev. Mr. Crisparkle in Drood at the Savoy Theatre (1987), Dr Mandril in City of Angels at the Prince of Wales Theatre (1993), Parchester in Me and My Girl at the Alexandra Theatre, Birmingham (2001), Alderman Fitzwarren in Dick Whittington at the  Civic Theatre in Aylesbury (2002), Baron Hardup in Cinderella at the Royal Spa Centre in Leamington Spa (2004), Brassett in Charley's Aunt at the Northcott Theatre (2004), and Rupert Matthew in Moonshadow at Jerwood Space (2005).

Personal life 
Wimbush lives in Wandsworth London

Filmography

Film

Television

References

External links
Wimbush's profile on Actors and Writers London website

1949 births
English male film actors
English male stage actors
English male television actors
Living people
Alumni of the Guildhall School of Music and Drama
Male actors from London